Yannick Favennec Becot (born 12 August 1958) is a French politician of the Horizons party, within the Ensemble Citoyens coalition supporting incumbent President Emmanuel Macron, who has been serving as a member of the National Assembly since the 2002 elections, representing the Mayenne department.

Political career
Born in Chaudron-en-Mauges, Maine-et-Loire, Favennec Becot served in Parliament on the Committee on Economic Affairs (2002–2012) and the Committee on Sustainable Development and Regional Planning (2012–2017) before moving to the Defence Committee in 2017. Since 2017, he has also been a quaestor and therefore part of the Assembly's Bureau in the 15th legislature of the French Fifth Republic, under the leadership of president Richard Ferrand.  In addition to his committee assignments, Favennec Becot is part of the French Parliamentary Friendship Group with the United Arab Emirates.

Ahed of the 2022 French legislative election, Favennec Becot joined Horizons, a centre-right party within Emmanuel Macron's centrist Ensemble Citoyens coalition. He was elected in the first round.

Political positions
Ahead of the Republicans' 2016 primaries, Favennec Becot publicly endorsed Alain Juppé as the centre-right parties' candidate for the 2017 French presidential election.

In July 2019, Favennec Becot voted against the French ratification of the European Union's Comprehensive Economic and Trade Agreement (CETA) with Canada.

References

1958 births
Living people
People from Maine-et-Loire
Independent Republicans politicians
Union for a Popular Movement politicians
Deputies of the 12th National Assembly of the French Fifth Republic
Deputies of the 13th National Assembly of the French Fifth Republic
Deputies of the 14th National Assembly of the French Fifth Republic
Deputies of the 15th National Assembly of the French Fifth Republic
Deputies of the 16th National Assembly of the French Fifth Republic
Union of Democrats and Independents politicians
Horizons politicians